Sarsanda is a village in the Aantroli Kalan Gram Panchayat of the Degana Tehsil of the Nagaur District of the Rajasthan State of India.

Community 
Sarsanda has a total population of 1,316 or 1,322, of which 49.2% are male and 50.8% are female.

References 

Villages in Nagaur district